Summer Brenner (born 1945) is a writer and an activist. Brenner's works include short stories, novellas, noir crime, youth social justice novels and poetry.

Books and reception 
From the The Los Angeles Times, about Dancers and the Dance, “The wisdom of the body is Summer Brenner’s terrain. She is the author as choreographer, a moving force with a pen.”

From The Economist about My Life in Clothes, “Clothing is the organizing principle of these stories... Ms. Brenner's prose is rhythmic, and she unerringly locates the universal in the very specific...expertly handl[ing] our expectations, curiosities and desires.”

I-5 and Nearly Nowhere are two noir novels with political themes, published by PM Press/Switchblade. Nearly Nowhere was also published as Presque nulle part by Gallimard’s Série noire.

Taught in the West Contra Costa School District, Richmond Tales, Lost Secrets of the Iron Triangle started the annual “Richmond Tales Health and Literacy Festival” 2011-2014; and inspired a theatrical adaptation in collaboration with the East Bay Center for Performing Arts and the Richmond Rotary. It was chosen as the first One City, One Book for the City of Richmond by Mayor Gayle McLaughlin; and selected by the California Teachers Association for Read Across America. 

City of Oakland Councilwoman Lynette McElhaney called Oakland Tales, Lost Secrets of The Town “[a] book for this generation of Oakland youth.” It has had a half-dozen theatrical adaptations, including at Skyline High School under the direction of Awele Makeba and Word for Word Performing Arts Company.

Her work also includes poetry and the occasional essay. The Missing Lover (3 novellas) was published in 2022 with illustrations by Lewis Warsh.

Her literary papers are available at the University of Delaware - Special Collections.

Community projects and activism (selection) 
Brenner is a board member of West County READS; a former tutor at the City of Richmond’s Literacy for Every Adult Program; a transportation justice advocate; an activist-writer for Amnesty International; part of the “Save Tookie” campaign for Stanley Tookie Williams; a member of the Retort collective; and a participant in the “Al-Mutanabbi Street Starts Here Project” (2007–present), archived at the RBML, Columbia University.

Where We’re From is an inter-generational, cross-cultural oral history, poetry, and photography project for Richmond youth and their families in partnership with photographer Ruth Morgan and Community Works West.

Honors and awards (selection) 
Richmond Tales, Lost Secrets of the Iron Triangle received awards from the City of Richmond’s Historic Preservation Commission and Human Rights and Human Relations Commission; Ivy, Homeless in San Francisco from Children’s Literary Classics and Moonbeam Children’s Book Awards; and Oakland Tales, Lost Secrets of The Town from the Oakland Heritage Alliance.

In partnership with Community Works West, Brenner has been the recipient of grants from the California Arts Council, the Christensen Fund, the Creative Work Fund, the Rex Foundation, the Rogers Family Foundation, the San Francisco Foundation, et al.

Productions and presentations (selection) 
Brenner has collaborated and performed with musicians and poets G.P. Skratz, Andy Dinsmore, Bob Ernst, and Hal Hughes of Arundo / Smooth Toad, producing the album: Because the Spirit Moved.

Presentations include “Creating Place-Based Social Justice Fiction for Youth” at the ISKME Big Ideas Fest: Educating to Be Human, San Jose, California; and “Within . . . Without,” a photograph and text exhibit for the “Al-Mutanabbi Street Starts Here Project” at the Arab Art Festival: Shadow and Light. Liverpool, England.

Bibliography

Fiction 

 Dancers and the Dance. Minneapolis: Coffee House Press. 1990. 
 Presque nulle part. Paris: Gallimard Série noire 2554. 1999. 
 I-5, A Novel of Crime, Transport, and Sex. Oakland: PM Press. 2009. 
 My Life in Clothes. Pasadena: Red Hen Press. 2010. 
 Nearly Nowhere. Oakland: PM Press. 2012. 
 The Missing Lover. Brooklyn: Spuyten Duyvil, 2022.

Novels for youth 

 Ivy, Tale of a Homeless Girl in San Francisco. Berkeley: Creative Arts. 2000. Illustrated by Marilyn Bogerd. 
 Richmond Tales, Lost Secrets of the Iron Triangle. Berkeley: Time & Again Press. 2009. Illustrated by Miguel “Bounce” Perez. 
 Ivy, Homeless in San Francisco. Oakland: PM Press/Daly City: ReachandTeach.com 2011. Illustrated by Brian Bowes. 
 Oakland Tales, Lost Secrets of The Town. Berkeley: Time & Again Press. 2014. Illustrated by Miguel “Bounce” Perez.

Poetry collections / chapbooks 

 Everyone Came Dressed as Water. Albuquerque: The Grasshopper Press. 1973.
 From the Heart to the Center. Berkeley: The Figures. 1977. 
 The Soft Room. Berkeley: The Figures. 1978.
 One Minute Movies. San Francisco: Thumbscrew Press. 1996.
 The Missing Lover, collages by Lewis Warsh. Brooklyn: Spuyten Duyvil. 2006.
 Do You Ever Think of Me? Ontario: Rob McLennan above/ground press. 2021.

Anthologies (selection) 

 Rising Tides: 20th Century Women Poets (ed. Laura Chester). New York: Washington Square Press, Simon & Schuster. 1973.
 Deep Down: The New Sensual Writing by Women (ed. Laura Chester). Boston: Faber & Faber.1988. .
 The Unmade Bed: Sensual Writing on Married Love (ed. Laura Chester). New York: HarperCollins. 1992. .
 The Stiffest Corpse (ed. Andrei Codrescu). San Francisco: City Lights Books. 1989. .
 American Poets Say Good-Bye to the 20th Century (ed. Codrescu & Rosenthal). New York: Four Walls Eight Windows. 1996. .
 Infinite City, A San Francisco Atlas, essay “Red Sinking, Green Soaring” (Rebecca Solnit). Berkeley: University of California Press. 2010. . 
 Send My Love and a Molotov Cocktail: Stories of Crime, Love and Rebellion (ed. Phillips & Gibbons). Oakland: PM Press. 2011. .
 Al-Mutanabbi Street Starts Here: Poets and Writers Respond to the March 5, 2007 Bombing of Baghdad’s “Street of Booksellers” (ed. Beau Beausoleil & Deema Shehabi, guest editor Summer Brenner). Oakland: PM Press. 2012. .
 Jewish Noir (ed. Kenneth Wishnia). Oakland: PM Press. 2015. . 
 The Year’s Best Crime and Mystery Stories 2016 (ed. Rusch & Helfers). Toronto: Kobo Inc. 2016. .
 River of Fire: Commons, Crisis and the Imagination (ed. Cal Winslow). Arlington, MA: The Pumping Station. 2016. .
 Berkeley Noir (ed. Jerry Thompson & Owen Hill). Brooklyn: Akashic Books. 2020. .

References

1945 births
21st-century American novelists
20th-century American novelists
American women novelists
American crime fiction writers
American young adult novelists
American women short story writers
20th-century American short story writers
21st-century American short story writers
American women poets
20th-century American poets
21st-century American poets
Activists from the San Francisco Bay Area
Living people